Catherine Jacques (born 28 September 1979, in Merksem) is a Belgian judoka who competed in the middleweight category (70 kg). She is a multiple-time national champion, and a four-time bronze medalist for her category at the European Judo Championships. At the 2004 Summer Olympics in Athens, Jacques missed out of the Olympic podium in the women's 70 kg category, after she was defeated by Germany's Annett Böhm, who scored an ippon within thirty-eight seconds, in the bronze medal match. She was able to fight back against her opponent for a rematch to capture the bronze medal, this time at the 2005 World Judo Championships in Cairo, Egypt.

At the 2008 Summer Olympics in Beijing, Jacques qualified again for the 70 kg category. She was eliminated in the second preliminary round, losing out to Italy's Ylenia Scapin, who scored a single yuko point in the match.

References

External links

 
 

 NBC Olympic Profile

1979 births
Living people
Belgian female judoka
Olympic judoka of Belgium
Judoka at the 2004 Summer Olympics
Judoka at the 2008 Summer Olympics
People from Merksem
Sportspeople from Antwerp
Universiade medalists in judo
Universiade silver medalists for Belgium